Nuts in May is a 1964 comedy novel by the British writer Richard Gordon, best known for writing the Doctor series.Peacock p.355

When his son Teddy is sent down from Oxford University and breaks off his engagement to a wealthy young woman, the publisher Algernon Brickwood attempts to take him in hand.

References

Bibliography
 Peacock, Scott. Contemporary Authors''. Cengage Gale, 2002.

1964 British novels
Novels by Richard Gordon
Comedy novels
Heinemann (publisher) books